Necdet Ergün (born 5 May 1954) is a Turkish football coach and former player. He played in Süper Lig clubs Beşiktaş and Trabzonspor. He won several cups is both club .

Honours
Trabzonspor
Süper Lig: 1977-78
Prime Minister's Cup: 1976
Presidential Cup :  1978, 1979

Beşiktaş
Süper Lig: 1981-82, 1985-86
Presidential Cup :  1986

References

External links

 

1954 births
Living people
People from Sivas
Turkish footballers
Turkish football managers
Beşiktaş J.K. footballers
Sarıyer S.K. footballers
Boluspor footballers
Süper Lig players
Association football forwards